That'll Be the Day is a 1973 British coming of age drama film directed by Claude Whatham, written by Ray Connolly, and starring David Essex, Rosemary Leach and Ringo Starr. Set primarily in the late 1950s and early 1960s, the film tells the story of Jim MacLaine (Essex), a British teenager raised by his single mother (Leach). Jim rejects society's conventions and pursues a hedonistic and sexually loose lifestyle, harming others and damaging his close relationships in the process. The cast also featured several prominent musicians who had lived through the era portrayed, including Starr, Billy Fury, Keith Moon, and John Hawken.  
The success of That'll Be the Day led to a sequel, Stardust, that followed the life of Jim MacLaine through the 1960s and 1970s.

Plot

In an urban area in early 1940s England, a young child, Jim MacLaine, lives with his mother Mary and his grandfather. Jim's seaman father returns, spends time with him, and works in the family's grocery shop. However, Jim's father finds himself unable to settle down, and soon leaves again for good, abandoning his wife and son. Mary continues to run the shop and raise Jim on her own.

In the late 1950s. Jim is now a very bright but bored schoolboy in his final year at the local secondary school. Jim's mother plans that he will do well on his final exams, qualify for university, and have many opportunities open to him. Jim is far less enthusiastic about continuing his education, and prefers drawing, writing poetry, listening to rock n' roll music, and pursuing girls - unsuccessfully. Instead of going with his friend Terry to take his exams, Jim runs away to the coast to work as a deckchair attendant, disappointing and upsetting his mother. He moves on to a barman job at a holiday camp, where he befriends the experienced barman Mike. Mike helps Jim hook up with willing women for his first sexual experiences. Jim is also drawn to the music and lifestyle of the resident singer, Stormy Tempest and his drummer, J.D. Clover.

Mike and Jim next get jobs at a funfair, supplementing their meager pay by short-changing the customers. Jim quickly becomes a heartless fairground Romeo, having one-nighters with a wide variety of women, including a young schoolgirl whom he rapes. He lies to Mike about the encounter, but Mike sees through it and berates him. Shortly afterwards, Mike short-changes a gang member and is attacked by the whole gang. Jim sees Mike being beaten, but instead of helping Mike, Jim hurries away pretending he saw nothing and has a tryst with another fair worker. The severely injured Mike is hospitalized and cannot return, and Jim gets a promotion that was supposed to go to Mike.

Jim contacts Terry, who is now at university, but discovers that Terry and the girls at his university look down on his lifestyle and musical tastes. Jim decides to return home after two years, finding his resentful mother struggling to run the grocery shop and care for her father, now an invalid. Jim helps his mother with the shop and starts dating Terry's sister Jeanette over the objections of her mother and Terry. Unlike all his previous dates, Jim does not have sex with Jeanette, even though she is willing to do so out of love for him. Jim and Jeanette marry, with Terry and her mother wrongly assuming she must be pregnant. Jim, angry at Terry and ambivalent about losing his freedom, has sex with Terry's girlfriend Jean on the night before his wedding.

Jim and Jeanette live with his mother and grandfather. Jim pretends to be going to night school, but is secretly spending his nights at rock n' roll shows. Jeanette gets pregnant and they have a son. Jean and Terry plan to get engaged, and Jean makes suggestive remarks to Jim in front of Jeanette.

After talking with friends in a band, Jim leaves home, repeating the pattern of his father. Jeanette cries, but his mum is unsurprised. The film ends as Jim buys a secondhand guitar.

Cast

David Essex as Jim MacLaine
Ringo Starr as Mike
Rosemary Leach as Mary MacLaine
James Booth as Mr. MacLaine
Billy Fury as Stormy Tempest
Rosalind Ayres as Jeanette Sutcliffe
Keith Moon as J.D. Clover
Robert Lindsay as Terry Sutcliffe
Deborah Watling as Sandra
Brenda Bruce as Doreen
Beth Morris as Jean
Daphne Oxenford as Mrs. Sutcliffe
Kim Braden as Charlotte
Johnny Shannon as Jack
Karl Howman as Johnny
Sue Holderness as Shirley
Érin Geraghty as Joan
Sacha Puttnam as Young Jim Maclaine
Peter Turner as Teddy Boy

Production

Development
David Puttnam and his producing partner Sandy Lieberson met with Nat Cohen of EMI Films who agreed to provide half the budget. The other half - £100,000 - was obtained from Ronco Records on the condition that the film include 40 songs from Ronco's catalog of old hits, which Ronco could then package and sell on TV as a soundtrack album.

Writing
According to screenwriter Ray Connolly, the film was Puttnam's idea, who had worked in advertising and recently moved into film production. Connolly says Puttnam was inspired by Harry Nilsson's song "1941", in which an early-1940s father deserts his young son, who subsequently joins a circus; Puttnam suggested changing the circus to a fair.  Puttnam hired Connolly, who a journalist he was friends with, to write the script.

Connolly wrote the script in the evenings and said they would "ransack our own lives as we created the fictional character of Jim Maclaine, and steal moments from our favourite films, a bit from East of Eden here, something from Francois Truffaut’s The 400 Blows there."

Puttnam offered the directing job to Michael Apted who turned it down, Director Claude Watham was given the job off the back of his TV movie Cider with Rosie - Puttnam was impressed with his period detail. Puttnam also liked the fact that Watham was not that interested in rock'n'roll and would provide a counterbalance to Puttnam and Connolly.

Casting
Connolly said that David Essex, who was then starring in a West End production of Godspell, was cast in an effort to make the selfish Jim MacLaine character more likeable to an audience, because Essex "was so good looking and likeable an audience would forgive him anything."

Ringo Starr was cast as Mike after Connolly, who had never been to a holiday camp, consulted him and former Beatles road manager Neil Aspinall about their Butlins memories. Aspinall also helped to put together the camp band that appeared in the film. Several roles were played by prominent musicians who had lived through the same era portrayed in the film, including Starr, Billy Fury, Keith Moon of the Who, and John Hawken of the Nashville Teens.

Filming
Filming was done on the Isle of Wight because the area still had a late-1950s look in the early 1970s. When filming started on the 23rd October 1972, Essex had a seven-week break from his Godspell role to film the picture.

Puttnam clashed with Watham during filming, saying the director did not understand all the subtext of the script. When Watham fell ill Alan Parker directed for two days.

Soundtrack 
The tie-in soundtrack to That'll Be the Day was released by Ronco and listed as a various artists album rather than the official film soundtrack. On the Official Albums Chart Top 50 for the week ending 18 August 1973, all the compilations listed as 'various artists' albums were taken out of the chart, but those billed as 'official soundtracks' (to films such as A Clockwork Orange and Cabaret) were kept in. This had a major affect on the chart position of the That'll Be the Day album  as it was excluded from the chart countdown and disappeared from number one after spending its seventh week in the top spot.

Buddy Holly and the Crickets – "That'll Be the Day"
Billy Fury – "A Thousand Stars"
Billy Fury – "Long Live Rock"
Billy Fury – "Get Yourself Together"
Billy Fury – "That's Alright Mama"
Billy Fury – "What Did I Say"
Wishful Thinking – "It'll Be Me"
Dion and the Belmonts – "Runaround Sue"
The Everly Brothers – "Bye Bye Love"
The Everly Brothers – "Devoted To You"
The Everly Brothers – "Till I Kissed You"
The Everly Brothers – "Wake Up Little Suzy"
The Platters – "Smoke Gets In Your Eyes"
Big Bopper – "Chantilly Lace"
Jerry Lee Lewis – "Great Balls of Fire"
Little Richard – "Tutti Frutti"
Danny and the Juniors – "At the Hop"
Frankie Lymon – "Why Do Fools Fall In Love"
Johnny Tillotson -"Poetry In Motion"
Jimmie Rodgers – "Honeycomb"
Larry Williams – "Bony Moronie" 
Del Shannon – "Runaway"
Ritchie Valens – "Donna"
Eugene Wallace – "Slow Down"
Brian Hyland – "Sealed With a Kiss"
Bobby Vee – "Take Good Care of My Baby"
Del Shannon – "Hats Off to Larry"
Bobby Darin – "Dream Lover"
The Paris Sisters – "I Love How You Love Me"
The Poni-Tails – "Born Too Late"
Johnny and the Hurricanes – "Red River Rock"
The Monotones – "The Book of Love"
Bill Justis – "Raunchy"
Johnny Preston – "Running Bear"
The Diamonds – "Little Darlin' "
Ray Sharpe – "Linda Lu"
Lloyd Price – "(You've Got) Personality"
Buddy Holly and the Crickets – "Well All Right"
Dante and the Evergreens – "Alley Oop"
Viv Stanshall – "Real Leather Jacket"
Stormy Tempest ( Viv Stanshall ) – "What in the World"
Wolverine Cubs Jazz Band – "Weary Blues" (featured in the film but not on Soundtrack recording)
Buddy Knox - "Party Doll"
Maurice Williams & The Zodiacs - "Stay"         (despite its enormous popularity this album has never had an official CD release in the UK)

Chart positions

Release
The film was a hit at the box office (by 1985 it had earned an estimated profit of £406,000). Nat Cohen, who invested in the film, said it made more than 50% profit on top of its cost. It was one of the most popular movies of 1973 at the British box office.

Connolly said "At the time, I was astonished by its success. A sixth form drop out, who throws his school books into a river when he should be sitting his A-level history, writes poetry in the rain while hiring out deck chairs, and lets down just about absolutely everyone was hardly an obvious subject. But, on reflection, I can now see that there was nothing else like it at the time. And the music soundtrack was fantastic."

Reception
The Los Angeles Times called it "a very special, strange and fascinating movie."

According to Anne Billson in the Time Out Film Guide, the film was a "hugely overrated dip into the rock 'n' roll nostalgia bucket, ... " also commenting "Youth culture my eye: they're all at least a decade too old. But good tunes, and worth catching for Billy Fury's gold lamé act."

Awards and nominations

At the 27th British Academy Film Awards in 1973, the film received two nominations. Rosemary Leach for Best Actress in a Supporting Role and David Essex for Most Promising Newcomer to Leading Film Roles.

Sequels
Essex returned as Jim Maclaine the following year, in the 1974 sequel, Stardust, which continues the story into the early 1970s.

An independent radio drama recording project, That'll be the Stardust!, was released in 2008. The story follows the musical journey of Jim Maclaine's son, Jimmy Maclaine Jr.

References

Sources

External links 
 
That'll be the Stardust! Radio Drama

1973 films
British drama films
1973 drama films
Films set in the 1950s
British rock music films
Films set in the 1960s
Films produced by David Puttnam
Films produced by Sanford Lieberson
1973 directorial debut films
1970s English-language films
Films directed by Claude Whatham
1970s British films